Adrian-Floru Enescu (31 March 1948 – 19 August 2016) was a Romanian composer of film soundtracks and contemporary music.

As an individual musician, he also pioneered the local electronic scene during the 1970s and 1980s. He graduated from the "Ciprian Porumbescu" Music Conservatory in Bucharest, following the composition class of Aurel Stroe and Alexandru Pascanu in harmony.

Among his list of accomplishments are music for ballet in Italy, China and Australia, music for theater in Romania, Holland, Belgium, Japan, Australia, Canada, Colombia, and Costa Rica.

Other accomplishments 
 In 1976, Basorelief (symphonic pop)
 In 1980, Funky Synthesizer vol 1 (electronic music)
 In 1983, vocal lead Stereo Group (pop music)
 In 1984, Funky Synthesizer vol 2 (electronic music)
 In 1988,  (vocal lead, Loredana Groza (pop music))
 In 1989,  (vocal lead, Loredana Groza) (pop music)
 In 1999-2000, Jingle for "Arcadia Jingle Bank", Germany
 In 2000, Millennium Angel (produced by PRO TV Romania)
 In 2001, Diva (vocal lead, Loredana Groza) (pop music)
 In 2001, November Dreams produced by Axel Springer Company, Germany
 In 2001, EarthTone records division of Sonic Images Records USA published Invisible Music chapter 2 (electronic music)
 In 2002, Buddha Bar3 published Invisible Music chapter 1 (electronic music)
 In 2003, he arranged the music for The Christmas Parade of Disneyland Paris, France
 In 2013, Bird in Space jazz music, produced by A&A Records
 In 2014, Invisible Movies music for film, produced by A&A Records
 Symphonic music : electroacoustic music, music for solo viola, DOMINO - concerto for percussion & orchestra, TABU - concerto for vibraphone & orchestra, Labyrinth music for 8 clarinets, The Journey of Orpheus/opera - new version & variations on C. W. Gluck's themes, Cinematic for chamber orchestra 
 In 2014 Bach in showbiz (Bach variations) for Zoli Toth quartet

Film music 
 2014 Kira, Kiralina
 2005   
 2005 Second-Hand 
 2002 Noro 
 2001 Struma (documentary) 
 1999 Love and Other Unspeakable Acts 
 1998  
 1996 Eu sunt Adam! 
 1994 Pepi și Fifi 
 1994  
 1994 Thalassa, Thalassa 
 1992 Domnișoara Christina 
 1992 Hotel de lux 
 1991  
 1990  
 1989  
 1989 Mircea 
 1988  
 1988 Rezervă la start
 1987  
 1986  
 1985 Ringul 
 1985 Adela 
 1985 Ciuleandra
 1985 
 1985  
 1985 Racolarea 
 1983  
 1983 
 1983 
 1982 
 1982 Concurs 
 1982  
 1981  
 1981  
 1979  
 1979  
 1978  
 1978  
 1978  
 1978 Revansa 
 1977 L'art de la conversation 
 1977  
 1977 Tufa de Veneția 
 1977 Urgia
 1976 Tănase Scatiu 
 1973  
 1973 
 1973 Une seule nuit dans le studio (TV movie)

References
Daniela Caraman Fotea - Dicționar rock pop folk: 2000, Editura Humanitas,

External links

1948 births
2016 deaths
Romanian electronic musicians
Romanian film score composers